The Bush Caucus consists of bipartisan members of the Alaska Legislature who represent rural interests. The caucus typically consists of the members of the Alaska House from Districts 37-40 and the Alaska Senate from districts S and T, which cover the Alaskan Bush.

The group is bipartisan with most members being Democrats or Independents.  Mary Peltola is a past chair of the caucus. In the late 1990s, she rebuilt the caucus.

Membership

State Senate 

 Lyman Hoffman (1991-1993, 1995–present)
 Donny Olson (2001–present)

State House 

 Mary Peltola (1999-2009)
 Bryce Edgmon (2007–present)
 Neal Foster (2009–present)
 Tiffany Zulkosky (2018-2023)
 Josiah Patkotak (2021–present)
 Conrad McCormick (2023–present)

References

Alaska Legislature
Issue-based groups of legislators
Alaska caucuses
Rural society in the United States